The Sydney Opera House Trust operates and maintains the Sydney Opera House in Sydney for the Government of New South Wales in Australia.

Description
The Trust operates as one of the State's premier cultural institutions within the Create NSW portfolio.  It is constituted as a body corporate under the Sydney Opera House Trust Act 1961. It has 10 members appointed by the Governor of New South Wales on the nomination of the Minister for the Arts.  The Trustees must include at least two persons who have knowledge of or experience in the performing arts.  A Trustee holds office for three years and is eligible for reappointment for no more than three consecutive terms.

The Trust's objectives are:
 To administer, care for, control, manage, staff and maintain the Sydney Opera House building and site 
 To manage and administer the site as an arts centre and meeting place 
 To promote artistic taste and achievement in all branches of the performing arts 
 To foster scientific research into and to encourage the development of new forms of entertainment and presentation.

The trust is responsible for the oversight and appointment of the Sydney Opera House Executive Team, which "works in partnership with the Trust and is responsible for developing, implementing and monitoring the organisational strategy", and includes portfolio directors under the Chief Executive Officer.

Trust Members
The Trust consists of ten members in total, including the Chairperson. The current members of the Trust are:

Chairs

Chief executives

References

External links
 Official Sydney Opera House Trust website
 Sydney Opera House Trust Act 1961 (NSW)
 

Trust
Government agencies of New South Wales
1961 establishments in Australia
Organizations established in 1961